Jonathan Michael Burkardt (born 11 July 2000) is a German footballer who plays as a forward for Bundesliga club Mainz 05.

Career statistics

Burkardt came from SV Darmstadt 98 to the youth academy of Mainz 05 in 2014 and was active in the B-Youth and A-Youth Bundesliga for Mainz. In June 2018, the 17-year-old striker received a professional contract that initially ran until 2020. He took part in the professionals' summer training camp and finally made his Bundesliga debut on September 15, 2018 in a 2-1 win in the 05er's home game against FC Augsburg.At the end of the season he had played four Bundesliga games; he had also played twice for the Mainz second team in the Regionalliga Südwest. Until the end of the 2018/19 season, he was still eligible to play for the Mainz youth team and was also used there.

In the 2020/21 season he played in 29 of the 34 Bundesliga games and scored two goals, including the opening goal in Mainz's 2-1 win over eventual champions Bayern Munich on Matchday 31. In the first half of the 2021/22 season, Burkardt played in all 17 games and scored 7 goals. As a result, his Bundesliga colleagues, 234 professionals, voted him "promoter of the season" in a Kicker poll. The kicker himself led the striker in the ranking of German football in winter 2021/22 in his position behind Robert Lewandowski, Erling Haaland (both world class), Patrik Schick (international class) with nine other players in the national class. Throughout the season he played in all competitive games and scored a total of eleven goals in the Bundesliga; he was the top scorer of the 05er.

His contract runs until 2024.

References

External links
Profile at the 1. FSV Mainz 05 website 

2000 births
Living people
German footballers
Germany youth international footballers
Germany under-21 international footballers
Association football forwards
1. FSV Mainz 05 players
Bundesliga players
Sportspeople from Darmstadt
Footballers from Hesse